Heichinrou Hong Kong (聘珍樓), is a restaurant in Yokohama Chinatown, Japan, opened in 1884 and operated by several generations. It is a separate entity from Heichinrou Japan, but both have been represented by Yasuhiro Hayashi (林康弘) since 1988. The Hong Kong subsidiary started with Heichinrou Seafood Restaurant in Tsim Sha Tsui, then opened another restaurant called Metropol Restaurant in 1990. Metropol Restaurant is located in the Central Admiralty area targeting banquets and dimsum business. With over 100 tables, it has the largest capacity among all the Heichinrou Hong Kong restaurants. During the next several years, Hong Kong Heichinrou opened in Causeway Bay, Diamond Hill, Kwun Tong, and Central.

Chief Chef
Lai Wai-Hung (黎偉雄)	2003-2017

History

In 1998–1999, it won the Urban Council Restaurant Hygiene Competition Large Chinese Restaurant Group||Champion and in 2009, the Yasuhiro Hayashi awarded “Promotion and development of Cantonese cuisine contributor” award by the first China Canton Cuisine Summit, organized by China National Tourism Administration and Guangdong Government for long history of promoting Cantonese cuisine by building reputation and trust in health and safety, as an individual.||
|}

See also

 List of seafood restaurants

References

External links
 Heichinrou Hong Kong
 Heichinrou Japan
 Heichinrou Japan “Heichin Shoppers”

Restaurant chains in Hong Kong
Seafood restaurants